Cornall is a surname. Notable people with the surname include:

Jan Cornall (born 1950), Australian singer, comedian and writer
Ralph Cornall (1894–1984), Australian rules footballer
Robert Cornall, Australian public servant
Taylor Cornall (born 1998), English cricketer

See also
Cornally